Balázs Kiskapusi (born 12 November 1976) is a Hungarian former footballer.

Career
Kiskapusi started his senior career with Kecskeméti TE in 1995, after which he also played for Újpest FC and Fehérvár FC. In 2003, he signed for Akademisk Boldklub in the Danish Superliga, where he made eleven league appearances and scored three goals. After that, he played for Danish club Næstved BK and Hungarian clubs Nyíregyháza Spartacus, Jászapáti VSE, Vecsési, Egri, and Csömör KSK before retiring.

References

External links 
 Sitit Dániába követte futballista szerelme 
 Menni, vagy nem menni? 
 Turist banens bedste 
 Ungarer på vej til AB 
 JÁTÉKOSSORS. Kiskapusi Balázs (Csömör KSK): „Nem a futball tölti ki a mindennapjaimat” 
 Magyar bajnokot igazoltunk! 
 Kiskapusi Balázs nagy esélye 
 Kiskapusi Balázs 
 
 HLSZ Profile 
 Magyarfutball.hu Profile 
 Nemzeti Labdarúgó Archívum Profile 
 

1976 births
Living people
Hungarian footballers
Association football defenders
Hungarian expatriate footballers
Expatriate men's footballers in Denmark
Hungarian expatriate sportspeople in Denmark
Kecskeméti TE players
Fehérvár FC players
Akademisk Boldklub players
Újpest FC players
Jászapáti VSE footballers
Egri FC players
Nyíregyháza Spartacus FC players